Gardner is an unincorporated community in Rapides Parish, Louisiana, United States. Gardner is part of the Alexandria Metropolitan Statistical Area. Gardner has a population of 1,965. Gardner's post office ZIP code 71431. China Grove, a house listed on the National Register of Historic Places, is located in Gardner.

B.G. Dyess, a Southern Baptist pastor for seventy-three years and a member of the Louisiana State Senate from 1996 to 2000, was born in the Gardner Community in 1922 and is interred there at the Calvary Baptist Church Cemetery.

References

Unincorporated communities in Rapides Parish, Louisiana
Unincorporated communities in Louisiana